Enrique Mateo González de Castejón Velilla (born 26 April 1996) is a Spanish field hockey player who plays as a forward for Club de Campo and the Spanish national team.

International career

Junior national teams
González was a part of the Spain squad which won the bronze medal at the 2014 Youth Olympic Games in Nanjing, China. He played in two Junior World Cups. He was named the best player of the 2016 Junior World Cup.

Senior national team
González made his debut for the senior national team in November 2014 in a test match against Great Britain. He represented Spain at the 2018 World Cup. At the 2019 EuroHockey Championship, he won his first medal with the senior team as they finished second. On 25 May 2021, he was selected in the squad for the 2021 EuroHockey Championship.

References

External links

1996 births
Living people
Field hockey players from Madrid
Spanish male field hockey players
Male field hockey forwards
Field hockey players at the 2020 Summer Olympics
Olympic field hockey players of Spain
Field hockey players at the 2014 Summer Youth Olympics
2018 Men's Hockey World Cup players
Club de Campo Villa de Madrid players
División de Honor de Hockey Hierba players
2023 Men's FIH Hockey World Cup players